By Sorrow's River is a 2003 novel by Larry McMurtry. It is the third, both in chronological and publishing order, of The Berrybender Narratives.  Set in the year 1833, it recounts the Berrybenders' journey south through the Great Plains to Bent's Fort on the Arkansas River.

The theme of random and senseless death, often present in McMurtry's western fiction, is particularly powerful in this book; several characters die due to their own poor judgement or that of others.

2003 American novels
Novels by Larry McMurtry
Western (genre) novels
Fiction set in 1833
Novels set in the 1830s

American historical novels
Western United States in fiction
The Berrybender Narratives